Austin Durant Mozée Carr (born December 25, 1993) is an American football wide receiver who is a free agent. He played college football at Northwestern. He played professionally with New England and New Orleans.

College career
A former walk-on at Northwestern University, Carr earned a scholarship and  became a starter in his junior year. In his senior year in 2016, Carr led the Big Ten Conference in receptions, receiving yards, and receiving touchdowns. Following the 2016 season, Carr was named the Richter–Howard Receiver of the Year and was named First-team All-Big Ten by the coaches and media. Carr was a team captain for Northwestern in 2016.

College statistics

Professional career

New England Patriots
On April 30, 2017, the New England Patriots signed Carr as an undrafted free agent to a three-year, $1.67 million contract that includes a signing bonus of $7,000.

Carr shined in the preseason, recording 14 catches for 153 yards and two touchdowns in the four games. Despite a strong training camp and preseason, Carr was waived by the Patriots on September 2, 2017.

New Orleans Saints
On September 3, 2017, Carr was claimed off waivers by the New Orleans Saints. He was active for two games during his rookie season but did not catch any passes.

In 2018, Carr played in 14 games, recording nine catches for 97 yards and two touchdowns.

On November 22, 2019, Carr was placed on injured reserve.

On May 7, 2020, Carr re-signed with the Saints. He was waived on September 5, 2020, and signed to the practice squad two days later. He was elevated to the active roster on October 12, October 24, October 31, and November 28 for the team's weeks 5, 7, 8, and 12 games against the Los Angeles Chargers, Carolina Panthers, Chicago Bears, and Denver Broncos, and reverted to the practice squad after each game. He was signed to the active roster on December 24, 2020. Carr was waived by the Saints on January 11, 2021, and re-signed to the practice squad two days later. He was released on January 16.

Personal life
Carr is a Christian. Carr is married to Erica Carr. They have one son together.

In November 2015, after registering with Be The Match two and a half years earlier, Carr was contacted that he may be a potential match to donate peripheral blood stem cells. Through a five-hour procedure, he was able to donate his stem cells via a blood transfusion, which ultimately saved the life of the recipient, a retired locomotive engineer for the Union-Pacific railroad who had non-Hodgkin’s lymphoma.

References

External links
New Orleans Saints bio
 Northwestern Wildcats bio

1993 births
Living people
American football wide receivers
New England Patriots players
New Orleans Saints players
Northwestern Wildcats football players
Organ transplant donors
People from Benicia, California
Players of American football from California
Sportspeople from the San Francisco Bay Area